Protothronos ("first-throned") is a Greek term used in the Eastern Orthodox Church to denote precedence among bishops (or rather their sees). Thus it can denote the first-ranked metropolitan bishop within a patriarchate, or the first among the suffragan bishops of a metropolitan see. Such bishoprics were in turn often raised to separate archbishoprics or metropolises.

See also 
 Primate (bishop), Catholic counterpart

References

Sources 
 

Greek words and phrases
Eastern Orthodox Church